Kłodkowo  (German Klätkow) is a village in the administrative district of Gmina Trzebiatów, within Gryfice County, West Pomeranian Voivodeship, in north-western Poland.

The village has a population of 260.

See also 

 History of Pomerania

References

Villages in Gryfice County